

Qualification system
A total of 64 athletes (32 men and 32 women) qualified to compete at the games. A nation could enter a maximum of two athletes per gender. As host nation, Canada automatically qualified a full team of four athletes. All other athletes qualified through the Official World Golf Ranking and Women's World Golf Rankings (and if necessary) the World Amateur Golf Ranking as of April 28, 2015 and April 30, 2015 respectively. All nations qualifying in the men's and women's singles events will also qualify for the mixed team event.

Summary

Qualifiers

References

External links
Official Golf World Ranking
Women's World Golf Rankings
Official World Amateur Golf Ranking

Qualification
Qualification for the 2015 Pan American Games